Gordin may refer to:

Surname Gordin
 Abba Gordin, (1887–1964) anarchist active in the Russian revolution
 Jacob Gordin, Russian-American playwright
 Michael D. Gordin (born 1974), American science historian and Slavist.
 Sidney Gordin (1918–1996), Russian-born American artist, professor
 Yehuda Leib Gordin, (1854–1925) Polish Rabbi who migrated to the US, father of Abba and Zeev Gordin

In fiction
 A minor character in Fire Emblem: Shadow Dragon and the Blade of Light